Kinyras Empas was a Cypriot football club based in Empa. The team was playing sometimes in Second, in Third and in Fourth Division. In 2003 were merged with APOP Peyias to form APOP Kinyras FC.

References

Association football clubs disestablished in 2006
Defunct football clubs in Cyprus
2003 disestablishments in Cyprus